Modou Barrow (born 13 October 1992), commonly known as Mo Barrow, is a Gambian professional footballer who plays for Saudi Arabian club Al-Ahli and the Gambia national team. He is a winger but can also play as a forward.

He grew up in Sweden where he played for several senior clubs. In 2014, he signed for Swansea City of the Premier League. After loans to three Championship clubs, he transferred to Reading in 2017. Barrow made his international debut for the Gambia national team in 2015.

Club career

Early life and Sweden
Barrow was born in the Gambia. When he was 11, his mother died. He and his four brothers joined their father in Sweden. He reflected that "Football obviously helped me get through that period of my life. I was very good at football and got a lot of friends at my new school, mainly because many of them really liked to play football with me. I was never bullied because I was from another country."

He spent his youth career at Östers IF and Mjölby AI, before earning his first senior appearances with Mjölby AI. His best friend from Gambia had moved to the town of Mjölby. While visiting his friend, he was invited to train with the club, and quickly caught the eye of the senior squad. This in turn led to a deal with the nearby club IFK Norrköping. After spells at fellow Swedish sides Mjölby Södra IF, IFK Norrköping, and Varbergs BoIS, he joined Swedish second-tier side Östersunds FK in 2014. He scored 10 goals in 19 matches in his only season for them in Superettan.

Swansea City
On 30 August 2014, Barrow completed his transfer to Premier League side Swansea City for an undisclosed fee, believed to be around £1.5 million, after being signed by manager Garry Monk. He became the first Gambian footballer to play in the Premier League – Omar Koroma spent two seasons at Portsmouth starting in 2008, but failed to make an appearance.

"I like the way Swansea play football, it reminds me of how I used to play back home. I've watched a lot of their matches on TV and I was impressed with what I saw," he said on signing for Swansea. "They like to give young players a chance and hopefully I can progress here." Barrow went straight into the Under-21s squad.
On 28 October 2014, Barrow was included on the bench for Swansea's League Cup match against Liverpool. He was assigned the squad number 58.

On 9 November 2014, Barrow made his Swansea City and Premier League debut against Arsenal, coming on in place of Marvin Emnes for the last 23 minutes of a 2–1 home win. He scored his first Swansea goal on 3 January 2015 in a 6–2 win at Tranmere Rovers in the third round of the FA Cup. Barrow signed a new four-year contract until June 2018. Barrow was loaned to Nottingham Forest on 11 March 2015 until the end of the 2014–15 season.

On 10 August 2015, Barrow was loaned to Blackburn Rovers on a three-month emergency loan. On 8 September, he was recalled by Swansea and remained a regular under manager Francesco Guidolin, Barrow scored his first league goal for Swansea in a 3–2 defeat at Bournemouth on 12 March 2016. He signed a new contract at Swansea on 7 July 2016, keeping him at the club until 2019 and also adding a £15 million pound release clause for the player.

Despite playing 20 times for Swansea during the first half of the 2016–17 season under Guidolin and Bob Bradley, after falling out of favour under new manager Paul Clement due to the signing of Luciano Narsingh, Barrow was made available for a transfer. He was strongly linked with a move to Championship side Newcastle United. On 31 January 2017, Barrow joined Leeds United on loan until the end of the 2016–17 season, with a view to a permanent deal. The move saw him link up with Monk. After failing to break into the first team, he was not purchased by Leeds. During his time at Swansea he became the first Gambian to score a Premier League goal.

Reading
On 21 July 2017, Swansea rejected a bid from Reading in the region of £1.25 million, before Barrow signed a four-year contract with Reading on 3 August for an undisclosed fee. He scored his first goal for Reading in a 2–1 home win against Aston Villa on 15 August.

Denizlispor (loan)
On 12 August 2019, Denizlispor announced the signing of Barrow on a season-long loan deal, with Reading confirming the deal a day later.

Jeonbuk Hyundai Motors
On 20 July 2020, Reading confirmed the permanent transfer of Barrow to Jeonbuk Hyundai Motors.

Al-Ahli
On 16 January 2023, Al Ahli Saudi announced the signing of Barrow from Jeonbuk Hyundai Motors.

International career
On 31 March 2015, Barrow was called up for the Sweden national under-21 football team, however he pulled out of the squad due to an injury he had sustained.

In May 2015, he was called up for the Gambia national football team, and on 22 May, he confirmed on his Twitter account that he had decided to play for his native Gambia. Barrow made his debut for Gambia during the 2017 Africa Cup of Nations qualification in a goalless draw away to South Africa on 13 June 2015.

Barrow scored his first international goal on 27 March 2017, opening a 2–1 friendly win over the Central African Republic in Kenitra, Morocco.

He played in the 2021 Africa cup of Nations, his national team's first continental tournament, where they made a sensational quarter-final.

Style of play
Barrow is a pacey winger, who likes to run with the ball and take on defenders and create chances. He can also play as a forward. He revealed that with his style of play that 'I want to get the fans on their feet, and I fight until the end'.

Personal life
Barrow lives with his fiancée and their daughter Anya, born in November 2014. Barrow holds a Swedish citizenship. In 2012, Barrow was sentenced to community service and probation after assaulting his girlfriend. He is a devout Muslim.

Career statistics

Club

International

Scores and results list Gambia's goal tally first, score column indicates score after each Barrow goal.

Honours
Jeonbuk Hyundai Motors
K League 1: 2020, 2021
Korean FA Cup: 2020, 2022

References

External links

1992 births
Living people
Sportspeople from Banjul
Gambian footballers
Association football forwards
Allsvenskan players
Superettan players
Premier League players
English Football League players
Süper Lig players
Saudi First Division League players
IFK Norrköping players
Östersunds FK players
Swansea City A.F.C. players
Nottingham Forest F.C. players
Blackburn Rovers F.C. players
Leeds United F.C. players
Reading F.C. players
Denizlispor footballers
Jeonbuk Hyundai Motors players
Al-Ahli Saudi FC players
The Gambia international footballers
2021 Africa Cup of Nations players
Gambian emigrants to Sweden
Gambian expatriate footballers
Gambian expatriate sportspeople in Wales
Expatriate footballers in Wales
Gambian expatriate sportspeople in England
Expatriate footballers in England
Gambian expatriate sportspeople in Turkey
Expatriate footballers in Turkey
Gambian expatriate sportspeople in South Korea
Expatriate footballers in South Korea
Gambian expatriate sportspeople in Saudi Arabia
Expatriate footballers in Saudi Arabia